Lise Gregory (born 29 August 1963) is a South African former tennis player who played primarily doubles. She played left-handed. Her career-high doubles ranking in 1990 was no. 18. She reached the quarterfinals of the Australian Open and was one of the top eight teams participating in the year-end Virginia Slims Championships.

She played in college for the University of Miami, earning seven NCAA All-American awards in both singles and doubles and the NCAA doubles championship in 1986 with long-time doubles partner Ronni Reis.

After her playing career, she became a college coach, first assistant coach at Vanderbilt University, then head coach at Florida State University and the University of North Carolina at Asheville, earning numerous coaching awards.

WTA Tour finals

Doubles 13 (7–6)

ITF finals

Singles (1–2)

Doubles: (7–1)

External links

 
 
 Biography on the UNC Asheville site
 University of Miami women's tennis records

South African female tennis players
Living people
1963 births
Sportspeople from Durban
Miami Hurricanes women's tennis players
Vanderbilt Commodores women's tennis coaches
Florida State Seminoles women's tennis coaches
UNC Asheville Bulldogs women's tennis coaches
White South African people
South African tennis coaches